Laura Sydell  formerly reported on Digital Culture for NPR.  She was born in New Jersey, and is a former senior technology reporter for Public Radio International's Marketplace, and a regular reporter on for National Public Radio's All Things Considered, Morning Edition, and Weekend Edition.  She was a Freedom Forum Teaching Fellow at the Graduate School of Journalism at University of California, Berkeley, teaching about reporting on culture.

Education
Born and raised in Millburn, New Jersey, Sydell is a graduate of Gill St. Bernard's School, Phi Beta Kappa graduate of William Smith, and later earned a Juris Doctor (J.D.) degree from the Cardozo School of Law at Yeshiva University.
In 1999, she spent a year in the fellowship program at Columbia University's National Arts Journalism Program.
After finishing the fellowship, Sydell went to San Francisco to work as a teaching fellow at the Graduate School of Journalism at University of California, Berkeley.

Previous work and awards
While she lived in New York, Sydell worked on Undercurrents  on the Pacifica Radio Network, and had articles published in many other publications.  She has also reported for other radio shows, including Crossroads.

In 1991 she was the co-writer, with Dennis Bernstein of "Savings and Loan Trading Cards" from Eclipse Enterprises, illustrated by Stewart Stanyard and edited by Catherine Yronwode. In 1995, she and Bernstein wrote "Friendly Dictators Trading Cards," illustrated by Bill Sienkiewicz, and again edited by Yronwode and published by Eclipse.

While a staff reporter for WNYC, her work won awards from The Newswomen's Club of New York, The New York Press Club, and The Society of Professional Journalists.  Her radio documentaries of activists have similarly won acclaim American Women in Radio and Television, The National Federation of Community Broadcasters, and Women in Communications.

In July 2011 Sydell co-reported and co-produced "When Patents Attack!" for This American Life with Alex Blumberg. The show examined the problem of patent trolls and the role of large patent collecting entities such as Intellectual Ventures in perpetuating the problem.  The show was a finalist for the 2011 Radio/Audio award from Investigative Reporters and Editors, and received the 2012 Gerald Loeb Award for Broadcast Enterprise business journalism from the UCLA Anderson School of Management.  It is also in Best Business Writing of 2011. The following year Sydell and Blumberg produced a sequel, When Patents Attack! Part 2.  

On November 5, 2013 Sydell and UCLA Professor Christopher M. Kelty debated with entrepreneur and Connected Patents CEO, Jaz Banga, and media artist and entrepreneur, Scott Snibbe, in an Oxford style debate about the state of the U.S. Patent System.

References

External links
Sydell's story on Wikipedia, broadcast on Weekend Edition February 20, 2005

1961 births
Living people
American reporters and correspondents
Hobart and William Smith Colleges alumni
Benjamin N. Cardozo School of Law alumni
Gerald Loeb Award winners for Broadcast
Gill St. Bernard's School alumni
People from Millburn, New Jersey